Svetlana Alekseyevna Gladysheva (born 13 September 1971) is a retired Russian alpine skier. In her early career she had her best results in the downhill, becoming the junior world champion in 1990, and finishing third at the seniors world championships in 1991 and at the world cups in 1991 and 1992. Later she was more successful in super-G competitions, winning a world cup in 1996, and an Olympic silver medal in 1994. She also competed at the 1992, 1994 and 1998 Olympics in the downhill and super-G events and finished fifth in 1998 and eighth in 1992 in the downhill. Gladysheva retired from competitions in 1998, and in 2010 became president of the Russian Alpine Skiing and Snowboarding Federation.

References

1971 births
Living people
Sportspeople from Ufa
Russian female alpine skiers
Soviet female alpine skiers
Alpine skiers at the 1992 Winter Olympics
Alpine skiers at the 1994 Winter Olympics
Alpine skiers at the 1998 Winter Olympics
Olympic alpine skiers of the Unified Team
Olympic alpine skiers of Russia
Olympic silver medalists for Russia
Olympic medalists in alpine skiing
Medalists at the 1994 Winter Olympics